Michail Fragkos (born 20 May 1990) is a Greek professional footballer who plays as a winger for Super League 2 club Irodotos.

Career 
In summer 2020, Fragkos signed for Cypriot Second Division club PAEEK. In September 2021, he joined German side VfB Auerbach in the Regionalliga.

Honours
Volos
 Football League Greece: 2018–19

PAEEK
 Cypriot Second Division: 2020–21

References

External links
  (2021–present)
  (2010–2021)
 
 Michail Fragkos at the Cyprus Football Association

1990 births
Living people
People from Rhodes
Sportspeople from the South Aegean
Greek footballers
Association football wingers
Thrasyvoulos F.C. players
Preveza F.C. players
Diagoras F.C. players
Rodos F.C. players
Paniliakos F.C. players
CD Comarca de Níjar players
Fokikos A.C. players
PAS Lamia 1964 players
Kallithea F.C. players
AEL Kalloni F.C. players
A.E. Sparta P.A.E. players
Volos N.F.C. players
GAS Ialysos 1948 F.C. players
Enosi Panaspropyrgiakou Doxas players
PAEEK players
VfB Auerbach players
Football League (Greece) players
Gamma Ethniki players
Super League Greece players
Tercera División players
Cypriot Second Division players
Regionalliga players
Greece youth international footballers
Greek expatriate footballers
Greek expatriate sportspeople in Spain
Greek expatriate sportspeople in Cyprus
Greek expatriate sportspeople in Germany
Expatriate footballers in Spain
Expatriate footballers in Cyprus
Expatriate footballers in Germany